Pinetown is an unincorporated community in Sussex County, Delaware, United States. Pinetown is located on Sweet Briar Road near Red Mill Pond, southwest of Lewes.

History
Pinetown's population, circa 1965, was 75 residents.

A 1997 newspaper article noted that the predominantly African-American community was located in an isolated area.  At the time, it had about 250 residents, but no businesses or bus services.  The residents of Pinetown were stated to be generally all descended from a set of eight siblings. The majority of structures in the community were mobile homes.  Children in the community went sent to schools in other towns for education.

Three years later, an article in the Wilmington News Journal estimated population to be about 150.  In 2006, the Pinetown Civic Association completed a new community center.  In 2015, a committee of the Delaware Housing Commission partnered with the Pinetown Civic Association to bring improvements and resources to Pinetown.

Location

References

Unincorporated communities in Sussex County, Delaware
 
Unincorporated communities in Delaware